Distractions is an extended play by Australian rock band Regurgitator and released in September 2010. The album was supported by a September Distractions tour.

Background and release
Regurgitator were signed to Warner Australia between 1995-2002 and released four studio albums, before signing with Valve Records in 2004 and releasing two further albums, In 2010, the band decided to release music 'as they go along'. Band member Quan Yeomans said "Album production was initially geared to provide marketing impetus for the sale of records. More and more, people are not listening to music this way. They download music for free from the internet and they pick and choose tracks and create their own play lists." The band moved to Melbourne and set up a 'home studios' which Yeoman further explained "The new paradigm actually suits the home recording/producing musician because it is more natural to focus and create one track at a time, release it and then move on".

Track listing
 "Making No Sense" (Quan Yeomans) - 2:37
 "Distractions" (Ben Ely) - 1:55
 "Miranda July" (Yeomans) - 2:45
 "Midday Sun" (Ely) - 5:10

Personnel
 Ben Ely - bass
 Cameron Potts - drums
 Quan Yeomans - guitar and vocals

Release history

References

2010 EPs
EPs by Australian artists
Regurgitator albums